Coming Home Jamaica is a 1998 album by the Art Ensemble of Chicago originally released on the Atlantic label and reissued in 2002 on the Dreyfus label. It features performances by Lester Bowie, Roscoe Mitchell, Malachi Favors Maghostut and Don Moye with Bahnamous Lee Bowie guesting on one track.

Reception
The Allmusic review by Richard S. Ginell states that "the whole album seems to have a relaxed, carefree, even at times lackadaisical feeling... this AEC working holiday is not going to push many envelopes".

Track listing 
 "Grape Escape" (Bowie) - 3:55
 "Odwalla/Theme" (Mitchell) - 5:06
 "Jamaica Farewell" (Mitchell) - 1:57
 "Mama Wants You" (Bowie, Favors) - 12:34
 "Strawberry Mango" (Art Ensemble of Chicago) - 3:46
 "Villa Tiamo" (Bowie) - 1:47
 "Malachi" (Mitchell) - 9:33
 "Lotta Colada" (Art Ensemble of Chicago) - 3:05
The 2002 reissue changes the track order and features three additional tracks:
 "Villa Tiamo" [alternate take] (Bowie) - 1:41
 "C Monster" (Mitchell) - 6:49
 "Blue Hole/Mr. Freddy" (Mitchell) - 11:54
 Recorded December 27, 1995 & January 16, 1996 in Bonham Springs, Ocho Rios, Jamaica

Personnel 
 Lester Bowie: trumpet, fluegelhorn
 Malachi Favors Maghostut: bass, percussion instruments
 Roscoe Mitchell: saxophones, clarinets, flute, percussion instruments
 Don Moye: drums, percussion
 Bahnamous Lee Bowie: keyboards (track 5)

References 

1998 albums
Atlantic Records albums
Art Ensemble of Chicago albums